This is a list of concertos and concertante works for piano left-hand and orchestra.

The first piano solo was an arrangement by Johannes Brahms of the Chaconne from Johann Sebastian Bach's Partita for Violin No. 2, BWV 1004, published in 1878. The Russian composer-pianist Alexander Scriabin composed the first original solo left-hand piece, Prelude and Nocturne for the left hand, Op. 9, in 1894.

The best known left-hand concerto is the Piano Concerto for the Left Hand in D by Maurice Ravel, which was written for Paul Wittgenstein between 1929 and 1930. Wittgenstein, who lost his right arm in World War I, commissioned a number of such works around that time, as did Otakar Hollmann.  More recently, Gary Graffman has commissioned a number of left-hand concertos.

List

Works for the right hand only
Works for piano right-hand only also exist, but there are far fewer of them than for left-hand only.

Concertante works involving piano right-hand include:
 Henri Cliquet-Pleyel (1894–1963) – Concerto for Piano Right Hand and Orchestra
 Arthur Bliss – Concerto for Two Pianos (3 Hands) and Orchestra, Op. 17 (1968; originally for tenor, piano, strings and percussion; then arranged for 2 pianos and orchestra for Phyllis Sellick and Cyril Smith; then arranged by Bliss and Clifford Phillips for 2 pianos 3 hands and orchestra)
 Malcolm Arnold – Concerto for Two Pianos Three Hands and Orchestra (also known as Concerto for Phyllis and Cyril), 1969.  One pianist plays with both hands, the other with the right hand only.
 Gordon Jacob – Concerto for Three Hands on One Piano, 1969 (written for Sellick and Smith).

References

External links
 Hans Brofeldt, "Piano Music for the Left Hand Alone"

 
 
Piano left-hand and orchestra